Jonathan Hivert (born 23 March 1985) is a French professional road bicycle racer, who currently rides for UCI ProTeam .

Career
In 2013, Chambray-lès-Tours Hivert won the general classification of the 2.1 event Étoile de Bessèges. He was 3 seconds in arrears of Jérôme Cousin of  before the final time trial, and he finally got the first position after besting Cousin by 7 seconds on the stage. Hivert joined  for the 2014 season, after his previous team –  – folded at the end of the 2013 season.

In October 2020, he was named in the startlist for the 2020 Vuelta a España.

Major results

2003
 2nd Road race, National Junior Road Championships
2005
 2nd Paris–Mantes-en-Yvelines
 6th Liège–Bastogne–Liège U23
2007
 5th Overall Tour de Luxembourg
2008
 2nd Overall Circuit de Lorraine
1st Stage 1
 6th Grand Prix d'Ouverture La Marseillaise
 6th Tour du Doubs
 10th Overall Étoile de Bessèges
 10th Tour de Vendée
2009
 5th Hel van het Mergelland
 6th Overall Étoile de Bessèges
 6th Grand Prix de Wallonie
 8th Overall Paris–Nice
 8th Grand Prix d'Ouverture La Marseillaise
2010
 1st Grand Prix d'Ouverture La Marseillaise
 2nd Tour du Doubs
 3rd Tour de Vendée
 4th Grand Prix d'Isbergues
 9th Overall Paris–Corrèze
2011
 1st Klasika Primavera
 1st Paris–Troyes
 1st Stage 2 Vuelta a Andalucía
 2nd Overall Tour du Gévaudan
 4th Boucles de l'Aulne
2012
 1st Stage 2 Tour de Romandie
 2nd Tour de Vendée
 4th Overall Tour de Luxembourg
 4th Paris–Bourges
 6th Overall Tour du Haut Var
 7th Cholet-Pays de Loire
 8th Overall Étoile de Bessèges
 8th Boucles du Sud Ardèche
 8th Paris–Tours
 9th Overall Tour de Picardie
2013
 1st  Overall Étoile de Bessèges
 Vuelta a Andalucía
1st Stages 1 & 2
 2nd Overall Tour de Luxembourg
 2nd Grand Prix of Aargau Canton
 5th Grand Prix de la Somme
 7th Overall Circuit de la Sarthe
 9th Vuelta a Murcia
2014
 7th Classic Sud-Ardèche
 8th Grand Prix Cycliste de Montréal
2015
 3rd Overall Tour du Haut Var
 5th Overall Tour du Gévaudan Languedoc-Roussillon
 5th Grand Prix La Marseillaise
 8th Tour du Finistère
 9th Tour de Vendée
 9th La Drôme Classic
2016
 5th Coppa Sabatini
 7th Giro dell'Emilia
 9th Grand Prix de Wallonie
 9th Tour de Vendée
 10th Overall Tour de Wallonie
2017
 1st  Overall Vuelta a Castilla y León
1st  Points classification
1st Stage 2
 2nd Grand Prix de Plumelec-Morbihan
 3rd Overall Tour de Yorkshire
 4th Overall Tour La Provence
 8th Overall Tour du Haut Var
 8th La Drôme Classic
2018
 1st  Overall Tour du Haut Var
1st  Points classification
1st Stages 1 & 2
 1st Tour du Finistère
 1st Stage 3 Paris–Nice
 5th Overall Étoile de Bessèges
 6th Tour de Vendée
 6th La Drôme Classic
 7th Grand Prix de Wallonie
 8th Overall Tour La Provence
 10th Overall Tour de Yorkshire
2019
 1st GP Miguel Induráin
 1st Stage 2 Vuelta a Aragón
 4th Grand Prix de Wallonie
 5th Classic Loire Atlantique
 7th Tour du Doubs
 9th Tour du Finistère
2021
 8th Tour du Finistère
 9th Faun-Ardèche Classic
2022
 10th Clásica Jaén Paraíso Interior

Grand Tour general classification results timeline

References

External links
 
 

French male cyclists
1985 births
Living people
People from Chambray-lès-Tours
Sportspeople from Indre-et-Loire
Cyclists from Centre-Val de Loire